Cheilotrichia cinerascens is a palearctic species of craneflies in the family Limoniidae. It is found in a wide range of habitats and micro habitats: in earth rich in humus, in swamps and marshes, in leaf litter and in wet spots in woods.

References

External links 
 Ecology of Commanster

Limoniidae